The Quite OK Image Format (QOI) is a specification for lossless image compression of 24-bit (8 bits per color RGB) or 32-bit (8 bits per color with 8-bit alpha channel RGBA) color raster (bitmapped) images, invented by Dominic Szablewski and first announced November 24th 2021.

Description 
The intended purpose was to create an open source lossless compression method, that was faster and easier to implement than PNG. A third party YouTube video explains how PNG and QOI compression are performed. Figures specified in the announcement and the video claim 20–50x faster encoding, and 3–4x faster decoding speed compared to PNG, with compressed sizes similar to those of PNG. The author has donated the specification to the public domain (CC0).

Software and language support 
QOI is supported natively by ImageMagick, IrfanView (as of version 4.60), FFmpeg (as of version 5.1), and GraphicConverter (v11.8+).

Community made plugins are available in GIMP, Paint.NET and XnView MP.

There are also implementations for various languages such as Rust, Python, Java, C++, C# and more. A full list can be found on the project's Git(Hub) repository README.

File format

Header
A QOI file consists of a 14-byte header, followed by any number of data “chunks” and an 8-byte end marker.
qoi_header {
    char magic[4]; // magic bytes "qoif"
    uint32_t width; // image width in pixels (BE)
    uint32_t height; // image height in pixels (BE)
    uint8_t channels; // 3 = RGB, 4 = RGBA
    uint8_t colorspace; // 0 = sRGB with linear alpha
// 1 = all channels linear
};
The colorspace and channel fields are purely informative. They do not change the way data chunks are encoded.

Encoding 
Images are encoded row by row, left to right, top to bottom. The
An image is complete when all pixels specified by  have been covered. Pixels are encoded as:

 Run-length encoding of the previous pixel
 an index into the array of previously seen pixels
 a difference compared to the previous pixel value in r,g,b ( or )
 Full r,g,b or r,g,b,a values ( or )

The color channels are assumed to not be premultiplied with the alpha channel (“un-premultiplied alpha”). A running  (zero-initialized) of previously seen pixel
values is maintained by the encoder and decoder. Each pixel that is seen by the encoder and decoder is put into this array at the position formed by a hash function of the color value.

The hash function for the index is:
index_position = (r * 3 + g * 5 + b * 7 + a * 11) % 64
Each chunk starts with a 2- or 8-bit tag, followed by a number of data bits. The bit length of chunks is divisible by 8 - i.e. all chunks are byte aligned. All values encoded in these data bits have the most significant bit on the left. The 8-bit tags have precedence over the 2-bit tags. A decoder must check for the presence of an 8-bit tag first. The byte stream's end is marked with 7  bytes followed by a single  byte.

The possible chunks are:

8-bit tag  (254)
 8-bit red channel value
 8-bit green channel value
 8-bit blue channel value

The alpha value remains unchanged from the previous pixel.

8-bit tag  (255)
 8-bit red channel value
 8-bit green channel value
 8-bit blue channel value
 8-bit alpha channel value

2-bit tag 
 6-bit index into the color index array: 

A valid encoder must not issue 2 or more consecutive 
chunks to the same index.  should be used instead.

2-bit tag 
 2-bit red channel difference from the previous pixel 
 2-bit green channel difference from the previous pixel 
 2-bit blue channel difference from the previous pixel 

The difference to the current channel values are using a wraparound operation, so  will result in 255, while  will result in 0.

Values are stored as unsigned integers with a bias of 2. E.g. −2 is stored as 0. 1 is stored as 3. The alpha value remains unchanged from the previous pixel.

2-bit tag 
 6-bit green channel difference from the previous pixel 
 4-bit red channel difference minus green channel difference 
 4-bit blue channel difference minus green channel difference 

The green channel is used to indicate the general direction of change and is encoded in 6 bits. The red and blue channels (dr and db) base their diffs off of the green channel difference. I.e.:
dr_dg = (cur_px.r - prev_px.r) - (cur_px.g - prev_px.g)
db_dg = (cur_px.b - prev_px.b) - (cur_px.g - prev_px.g)
The difference to the current channel values are using a wraparound operation, so  will result in 253, while  will result in 1.

Values are stored as unsigned integers with a bias of 32 for the green channel and a bias of 8 for the red and blue channel. The alpha value remains unchanged from the previous pixel.

2-bit tag 
 6-bit run-length repeating the previous pixel

The run-length is stored with a bias of −1.

References

External links 
 Format website: C Source code and benchmark results
 1 page PDF specification 
 GitHub repository (including C implementation)  

Computer-related introductions in 2021
Graphics standards
Image compression
Open formats
Raster graphics file formats